Samuel "Sam" Gee was an English professional rugby league footballer who played in the 1920s and 1930s.

He is the uncle of rugby league footballer Ken Gee, and the great uncle of rugby league footballer Sam Gee.

International honours
Sam Gee won a cap for England while at Huddersfield in 1930 against Other Nationalities.

References

England national rugby league team players
English rugby league players
Huddersfield Giants players
Place of birth missing
Place of death missing
Rugby league hookers
Rugby league props
Wakefield Trinity players
Year of birth missing
Year of death missing